Alicia Rickter (born September 21, 1972) is an American model and actress. She appeared as “Laura” in the comedy Buying the Cow and on the TV series Baywatch and The Young and the Restless. She posed nude for Playboy magazine as Miss October 1995. Although she was referred to as the 500th Playboy Playmate, it was not realized at the time that two of the earliest Playmates (Marilyn Waltz and Margaret Scott) were the same person, making Rickter No. 499. She has also appeared in three Playboy videos.

Rickter is the daughter of Diana Seminara and is married to baseball player Mike Piazza. They married on January 29, 2005, in Miami and have two daughters and a son.
Rickter was the vice president of A.C. Reggiana 1919, an Italian soccer club that she and her husband had an 85% ownership stake in. On 12 June 2018, Rickter and Piazza announced to A.C. Reggiana 1919's fans that they were not going to enroll the team for the Serie C 2018–2019 season, and they would put it up for sale. This caused A.C. Reggiana 1919's to be excluded from the professional leagues. The team was then re-established on 31 July 2018 under the name Reggio Audace Football Club. The Court of Justice of Reggio Emilia declared A.C. Reggiana 1919 bankrupt on 5 December 2019.

References

External links
 
 

1972 births
Actresses from Long Beach, California
American film actresses
American television actresses
Living people
1990s Playboy Playmates
21st-century American women